Mifflin Township is one of the thirteen townships of Wyandot County, north central Ohio, United States.  The 2010 census recorded 804 people in the rural township.

Geography
Located in the southwestern part of the county, it borders the following townships:
Salem Township - north
Crane Township - northeast
Pitt Township - southeast
Marseilles Township - south
Jackson Township - west
Richland Township - northwest corner

Part of the village of Kirby is located in northwestern Mifflin Township.

Name and history
Statewide, other Mifflin townships are located in Ashland, Franklin, Pike, and Richland counties.

Government
The township is governed by a three-member board of trustees, who are elected in November of odd-numbered years to a four-year term beginning on the following January 1. Two are elected in the year after the presidential election and one is elected in the year before it. There is also an elected township fiscal officer, who serves a four-year term beginning on April 1 of the year after the election. This is held in November of the year before the presidential election. Vacancies in the fiscal officership or on the board of trustees are filled by the remaining trustees.

References

External links
County website

Townships in Wyandot County, Ohio
Townships in Ohio